Edward Bysshe (died 1655) was English member of Parliament for Bletchingley elected in 1624, 1625, 1626, 1628, and April 1640.  He was the father of Edward Bysshe (1615?–1679).

References

Year of birth missing
1655 deaths
Members of the Parliament of England for constituencies in Surrey
English MPs 1624–1625
English MPs 1625
English MPs 1626
English MPs 1628–1629
English MPs 1640 (April)